Walker McCall (born 29 March 1954 in Irvine) is a Scottish retired professional footballer who played in Scotland, the United States, and Hong Kong.

Career
Beginning as an apprentice at Hurlford United, McCall played professionally in Scotland for Aberdeen, Ayr United, St Johnstone and Dundee, in the United States for the San Diego Sockers and the Atlanta Chiefs, and in Hong Kong for South China.

External links

NASL career stats

1954 births
Living people
Footballers from Irvine, North Ayrshire
Association football forwards
Scottish Football League players
Scottish footballers
Scottish expatriate footballers
Expatriate footballers in Hong Kong
Expatriate soccer players in the United States
Aberdeen F.C. players
Ayr United F.C. players
North American Soccer League (1968–1984) players
Atlanta Chiefs players
San Diego Sockers (NASL) players
Scottish expatriate sportspeople in Hong Kong
St Johnstone F.C. players
Dundee F.C. players
Hurlford United F.C. players
Scottish expatriate sportspeople in the United States